Cainta, officially the Municipality of Cainta, is a 1st class municipality in the province of Rizal, Philippines. According to the 2020 census, it has a population of 376,933 people.

Cainta serves as the secondary gateway to the rest of Rizal province from Metro Manila. With the continuous expansion of Metro Manila, Cainta is now part of Manila's conurbation, which reaches Cardona in its easternmost part and is therefore one of the most urbanized towns.

As the country's 3rd most populous municipality after Taytay, Rizal and Rodriguez, Rizal, efforts are underway to convert it into a city. However, Cainta faces different challenges especially with its boundary disputes with Pasig (Greenpark Village, Karangalan Village, St. Joseph Subdivision, Villarica Subdivision, Riverside and Midtown Village), Taytay, (Greenland and eastern part of Cainta) and Antipolo (Valley Golf and Country Club, Valley View and Palmera Heights), thus hindering cityhood efforts.

Etymology
One legend has it that there was an old woman called "Jacinta" who was well known not only in her own native town but also in the neighboring towns. In her youth, she was very popular because of her great beauty, kindness, and wealth. Although she was a member of a very rich clan, she showed generosity of heart to the poor. Hence, she became very much loved and respected.
Jacinta grew to be an old maid because after her sweetheart got sick and died, she never fell in love with anyone else. When her parents died and she was left alone in the house, she continued her charity work. She gave alms to the long line of beggars who came to her, and housed and took care of the orphans and children in the streets.

In her old age, she was still very popular and was fondly called "Ka Inta" ("Ka" referring to a term of respect for the elderly, as well as a term for the feeling of comradery or "kapwa" feeling for someone).

One Christmas Day, however, when the old and the young called on her to give their greetings, she was not by the window to welcome them. People wondered at her absence and shouted her name to call her attention but no one came to answer. Concerned, they went up the house and discovered the dead body of "Ka Inta" lying on the floor. Beside her were the piles of Christmas gifts she was preparing to give to her well-wishers that day. People far and wide grieved over her death. In memory of her goodness and her generosity, her native town was named after her and was called "Cainta".

However, Cainta was already named Cainta when the Spanish first arrived in the 1520s, so the Spanish name "Jacinta" is unlikely to be the origin of Cainta's name.

History

The Battle of Cainta

After the death of Rajah Matanda, Adelantado Miguel de Legaspi received word that two ships, San Juan and Espiritu Santo, had just arrived in Panay Island in the central Philippines from Mexico. One ship was under the command of Don Diego de Legaspi, his nephew, and the other of Juan Chacon. The two ships were in such disrepair when they arrived in Panay that one of them was not allowed to return to Mexico. Legaspi ordered that it be docked on the river of Manila. The Maestro de Campo was sent to Panay to oversee its transfer to Manila, with Juan de la Torre as captain.

To help spread the faith, several Augustinian friars were commissioned by Spain and were among the ship's passengers. One of them was Father Alonso de Alvarado, who had been in the armada of Villalobos. Another was Father Agustin de Albuquerque, who became the first parish priest of Taal town, south of Manila. Some of the missionaries were sent to Cebu province in the central Philippines to accompany Father Martin de Rada the Prior. Four stayed to work in Pampanga province and the environs north and south of Manila, which included the then-village of Cainta.

Meanwhile, Legaspi was determined to subjugate the people of Cainta and Taytay, a neighboring town. He sent his nephew Juan de Salcedo with a galleon (a small ship propelled by oars and sails) and 16 small boats accompanied by a hundred Spanish soldiers and many Visayas natives allied with them. Salcedo sailed on August 15, 1571, arriving in Cainta on the 20th. He sought peace from the villagers but the village chief, Gat-Maitan, responded arrogantly, told him the people of Cainta, unlike those of Manila, were not cowards, and would defend their village to the death. Confident in the defenses offered by their fort and the security of the site, they were joined by people from Taytay.

These two villages are on a plain on the shores of a river that flows from La Laguna and before arriving there divides in two large arms, both with abundant water. On its banks are found the two villages, half a league from each other, with the river passing through both before finally becoming one in a part of the terrain encircled by thick bamboo groves. These bamboos were tied together with liana, turning them into a thick wall where the people had constructed two ramparts with their moats full of water. By the river, they had built strong bulwarks with wooden towers and good artillery, guarded by a large number of warriors armed with arrows, swords and other projectile-type arms.

Deciding to attack, Salcedo first sent Second Lieutenant Antonio de Carvajal with some escorts to reconnoiter the town and determine the weakest point where they could enter. Carvajal, wounded by an arrow in his arm, returned with the information that the weakest spot, the least fortified and with the easiest access was the other part of an arroyo on the side of La Laguna where many boats could be seen entering the river.

Salcedo ordered installed in the prow of the galley a stone-throwing mortar. He and his men then spent the night on shore, while 20 soldiers and numerous allies from Manila remained with Carvajal on the galley with orders that when they heard firing, they should proceed with the attack on the bulwarks and the houses in the town, while Salcedo and his men tried to enter through the wall by the arroyo. When they heard the sound of the bugle, the signal that they had taken the town, they were to stop firing.

After giving these instructions, Salcedo began his march and turned toward the river where the attack was to take place. He arrived in the arroyo and found it defended by a fistful of valiant Cainta men who started to fire arrows and hurl lances.

Taken by surprise, the soldiers without waiting for Salcedo's order attacked the rampart and were overwhelmed by a rain of arrows. Finding such tenacious resistance, they began to retreat and flee in disarray.

Salcedo berated his men harshly for having attacked without his orders. Observing that in the other part of the arroyo the rampart was lower, he ordered a skiff brought there and after beaching it, he ordered some of his soldiers to use it as passage to the other side and take a more elevated point from where they could fire at the defenders of the town.

With the defenders retreating, Salcedo and his men were able to approach the wall and breach it. The intrepid Gat-Maitan with his Cainta men came to close the breach, forcing Saavedra to back off.

In the meantime, the cannons of the galley destroyed the bulwarks and the houses in the town in a manner the people had not seen before. And the shouts of the 600 Visayans allied with the Spanish made the natives believe that the Spaniards were already inside the poblacion [town proper]. Because of this, the valiant defenders of the breach abandoned it and retreated to the center of the town.

Salcedo observed this from a distance and ordered the breach attacked again. This time, the Spaniards encountered little resistance. Led by Salcedo and with Saavedra carrying the Spanish banner, they succeeded in entering the town. Together with their soldiers, they advanced rapidly and shortly scaled the wall where a bloody battle was fought.

The Cainta men, encouraged by their chief Gat-Maitan, preferred to die rather than surrender. Having taken over the walls, the Spaniards climbed the towers and hoisted the Spanish banner. At the blare of the bugle, the cannons stopped firing from the galley.

Spanish rule
Founded on November 30, 1571, Cainta was a fiercely independent village that fought valiantly against the Spaniards but was later defeated and became a visita (annex) of Taytay in 1571 under the Jesuits. Changes in ecclesiastical administration made Cainta a part of Pasig under the Augustinians but it was deeded back to the Jesuits by the King of Spain in 1696. Cainta became a separate township in 1760.

Conversion to Catholicism
The chief religion is Roman Catholicism. When the Spaniards came they celebrated the feast of St. Andrew the Apostle and a mass was held in a chapel made of nipa palm branches and wood. Many people came to attend and consequently were baptized into the faith.

The Church of Cainta was completed in 1715. It was gutted during World War II. Only the outer walls and the facade remained which was repaired with a coat of Portland cement. In 1727, an image depicting Our Lady of Light was brought to Cainta from Sicily, Italy, and was among the structures destroyed by Japanese and the joint American and Filipino bombs. Except for the outer walls, now greatly renovated, hardly anything remains of the old church. Extensive damage was also caused by recurrent earthquakes and typhoons that plagued the Philippines. The natives helped in its restoration and the new building was completed on February 25, 1968, and blessed by Manila Cardinal Archbishop Rufino Jiao Santos.

Cainta became an independent town in 1760. During the brief British occupation of Luzon (1762–1763), part of its British India troops known as Sepoys lived and intermarried with the natives in one of the town's barrios. The Indian left a culinary legacy in the spicy and highly seasoned dishes that are now part of mainstream Cainta cuisine. Cainta became part of Tondo (starting 1763) but separated in 1883 and incorporated with the district of Morong.

American colonial era

March 16, 1899
Exequiel Ampil was assigned by Emilio Aguinaldo to liberate Cainta.

Maj. William P. Rogers, CO of the 3rd Battalion, 20th US Infantry Regiment, came upon the Filipinos in Cainta, about 1,000 strong, and forced them to retreat. He burned the town. Two Americans were killed and 14 wounded, while the Filipinos suffered about 100 killed and wounded.

Upon the approach of the Americans, Exequiel Ampil y Dela Cruz, the Presidente Municipal of Cainta and a former Agente Especial of the Katipunan who had become a pronounced Americanista, strongly advised the Filipino soldiers to surrender. Instead, they shot him. Although wounded, Ampil managed to escape.

On March 3, 1902, major American newspapers, including the New York Times reported: “…Felizardo, at the head of twenty-five men armed with rifles, entered the town of Cainta and captured the Presidente of Cainta, Señor Ampil, and a majority of the police of the town. Señor Ampil has long been known as an enthusiastic American sympathizer, and it is feared that he may be killed by the enraged ladrones (thieves & land grabbers). A strong force of constabulary has been sent to try to effect his release.” [Timoteo Pasay was the actual leader of the guerilla band that kidnapped Ampil on Feb 28, 1902].

On March 4, 1902, near the hills of Morong town, Ampil found an opportunity to escape. A detachment of constabulary was taken from the garrison at Pasig and stationed at Cainta for his protection, he survived the war. And upon retiring from his military and political career, Don Exequiel Ampil together with his wife Doña Priscila Monzon, applied and managed their vast estate from Tramo (Rosario, Pasig) to Cainta River (San Jose, Cainta) up to the Valley Golf Club (Mayamot, Antipolo) down to Ortigas Extension (San Isidro, Taytay). The lots were the old and the new Municipal Halls stands, were also part of his estate.

Their son Dr. Jesus Ampil also became a Mayor (grandfather of the Ampil Brothers); whose siblings where Lumen, Atty. Vicente (of Pasay), Rosario & Jose.

Inclusion in Rizal province
In 1913, under the American rule, Cainta and Angono were consolidated with Taytay as one government entity. On January 1, 1914, it once again became an independent municipality and remained so to this day. Cainta is one of fourteen (14) municipalities of Rizal province after the inclusion of other towns of what are now referred to as Antipolo, Angono, Binangonan and Taytay.

World War II
In 1942, Japanese Occupation troops entered Cainta. In 1942 to 1944, local guerrilla groups of the Hunters ROTC was the four-year main invasions in Cainta against the Japanese, when the guerrillas were retreating by the Japanese before the liberation. In 1945, local Filipino troops of the 4th, 42nd, 45th, 46th, 47th and 53rd Infantry Division of the Philippine Army and 4th Constabulary Regiment of the Philippine Constabulary started the liberation and captured Cainta and helped the guerrilla resistance fighters of the Hunters ROTC Guerrillas to fight against the Japanese and ended World War II.

Liberation of Cainta
During World War II under the Allied Liberation, the some of all stronghold of local Filipino soldiers of the Philippine Commonwealth Army 4th, 42nd, 45th, 46th, 47th and 53rd Infantry Division and the Philippine Constabulary 4th Constabulary Regiment was sending the local military operations and liberated in all municipal town of Cainta and aided the local guerrilla groups of the Hunters ROTC Guerrillas against the Japanese Imperial armed forces and begins the Liberation of Cainta on 1945 and arrival by the American liberation forces enters the town.

The General Headquarters, Camp Bases and Garrisons of the Imperial Japanese Armed Forces in Cainta and inside of all Japanese soldiers of the Imperial Japanese Army was invaded the battles and captured of all the local Filipino soldiers of the Philippine Commonwealth Army and Philippine Constabulary and the local guerrillas of the Hunters ROTC Guerrillas after the fighting. After the war, the local casualties was over 3,810 Filipino troops of the Philippine Commonwealth Army and Philippine Constabulary killed in action and 12,400 wounded in action, the local guerrillas of the Hunters ROTC was over 200 killed in action and 700 wounded in action and over 15,000 Japanese troops of the Imperial Japanese Armed Forces was killed in action, 36,000 wounded in action and over 3,400 captured in action.

Post-war
On May 9, 1992, a fire broke out at the town's municipal hall two days before the 1992 local elections. The Rizal Provincial Police Command concluded that the fire was accidental, having been caused by a negligent janitor, although the PNP Criminal Investigation Service Command (CISC) refuted this, citing eyewitness accounts to the contrary.

Conversion to cityhood

Cainta has qualified for cityhood, due to its high population and high income. However, boundary disputes with neighboring cities and municipalities prevents the municipality from being a city. There was an attempt to convert Cainta into a city in 2003.

In late 2003, Mayor Nicanor Felix with the rest of its Sangguniang Bayan members, unanimously approved a resolution for Cainta's cityhood bid. That same year, on its annual fiesta, the municipality had its theme "Cainta: Lungsod 2004", promoting its bid for cityhood.

But the Sangguniang Panlalawigan of Rizal denied the resolution by the Sangguniang Bayan, stating that "it must resolve first its boundary disputes with Pasig, Antipolo and Taytay".

However, in January 2010, Rizal Governor Casimiro "Jun" Ynares III pushed the cityhood of Cainta and Taytay, due to the overabundance of jobs, amenities, and its people. In turn, Representative Joel Duavit of Rizal's 1st district filed and passed a bill effectively creating a district composed of Cainta and Taytay. The Bill is now up at the committee level in the Senate.

The idea of converting Cainta into a city and constituting into a lone legislative district was again proposed for the second time in 2018 after its failure in 2004.

Geography
Cainta is bounded on the north by Marikina and Antipolo but not bounded San Mateo, on the west by Pasig, and on the east and south by Taytay. It lies in the Marikina Valley, is 10% rolling hills and 90% residential-industrial. It has the province's highest number of rivers and streams. Historians claim that Cainta's old geographical boundaries encompassed the mountain slopes of Montalban.

Barangays
Cainta is politically subdivided into seven barangays. In the mid-1990s, Cainta submitted a petition to the Rizal provincial government to consider a proposal for 18 additional barangays, to make a total of 25 barangays. The proposal is still pending.

Climate

Demographics

In the 2007 census, it had a population of 304,478. Its population consists of 70% Roman Catholic Christians, 15% Non-Catholic Christians (including Baptists, Evangelicals, Iglesia ni Cristo, Ang Dating Daan, Aglipayan, Jesus is Lord, and others), 10% Muslims, 3% Chinese Buddhists, and 2% Sikhs. The people of Cainta are mostly Tagalog-speaking Filipinos.

A considerable number of the population are descended from Indian soldiers who mutinied against the British Army when the British briefly occupied the Philippines in 1762 to 1763. These Indian soldiers called Sepoy were Tamil people from Chennai and settled in town and intermarried with native women. The Sepoy ancestry of Cainta is still very visible to this day, particularly in Barrio Dayap near Barangay Sto. Niño.

Economy

Cainta is a highly urbanized town, which has an abundant mix of commercial, industrial and real estate businesses. As of 2018's Commission on Audit report, the town is the richest municipality in the country in terms of total assets. Cainta continues to attract businesses due to its proximity to Manila and the town's burgeoning population.

Native delicacies
Cainta is known for its native delicacies, a tradition inherited from nearby Antipolo, which is largely a cottage industry. Dating back to the 15th century, it became the town's principal source of income for more than four centuries. Suman (rice cake wrapped in banana leaf), latik (boiled down coconut milk used for glazing), coconut jam and the famous bibingka, are but a few of the sweet delights that lure many visitors to this town.

During the 20th century, Cainta dazzled the whole country when it baked the biggest rice cake ever and the town became known as the "Bibingka Capital of the Philippines". Bibingka is believed to have been adapted from the Indian cuisine, an influence from its Sepoy population. It comes from the Indian word bebinca also known as bibik, a dessert made of flour, coconut milk, and egg. The Philippine version is made of rice flour, coconut milk and salted duck eggs. Butter and sugar are used for glazing after cooking and before serving.

Government

Elected officials
The following are the elected officials during the 2022 elections:

Mayors

Benjamin Felix was deposed after People Power Revolution; replaced by OIC Mayor Dr. Renato Estanislao

Vice mayors

Municipal seal
The logo of Cainta – the emblem inside the double circle represents the flag of the Philippines in red, white and blue color. The three stars represent Luzon, Visayas and Mindanao. The eight sun rays represent the eight provinces that started the revolt against the Spaniards. The buildings represent the different business establishments operating in the municipality. The suman sa ibus, suman sa lihiya and suman antala represent the livelihood of its people; the same with bottled sweets made out of coconut milk called matamis na bao, nata de coco, caong, beans and many others. The piglets represent the backyard hog raising, a small-scale industry.

Landmarks

 Cainta Heritage Monument - located at the Junction, which adjoins Felix Avenue to the North, A. Bonifacio Avenue to the South, and Ortigas Avenue Extension on its east and west bounds.
 Cainta Municipal Hall - built in 1995 to replace the old building which was destroyed in the fire. The old site was converted to a town plaza.
 Hunters ROTC Monument - a memorial for the Hunters ROTC guerrillas of World War II, located in Barangay San Juan.
 Valley Golf and Country Club
 Liwasang Bayan (Town Plaza) - located at the Poblacion town proper. It was the former place of the old Municipal Hall destroyed in 1995; now used to host convocations, assemblies, and events.
 Our Lady of Light Parish Church - one of the oldest in the province, this church was erected by Fr. Joaquin Sanchez in 1715. Upon its elevation into a Parish in 1760, it was renovated many times because of heavy rains and earthquakes. In 1899, this church was destroyed during the Filipino-American war, leaving only the adobe wall surviving. The church features a mural depicting the patroness of the town, painted by national artist Fernando Amorsolo on the left side portion of the Church's main altar. Reconstruction of the church emerged was finished on February 25, 1968. On December 1, 2007, it was declared as a historical landmark by the National Historical Institute, coinciding with the celebration of the third centenary of the church construction. It was also declared as a Diocesan Shrine On December 1, 2018.
 Sta. Lucia East Grand Mall - a large shopping named and owned by Sta. Lucia Realty & Development, and is one of the largest shopping to the east of Metro Manila. The mall is a complex of 4 buildings connected by elevated foot bridges.
 Robinsons Place Cainta - located near the Junction, it houses a number of micro retail outlets and a BPO complex.
 APT Studios - Owned by APT Entertainment (a subsidiary of TAPE Inc.), the studio became the new home of longtime noontime variety show Eat Bulaga!. It was formerly known as the KB Studios under the late Kitchie Benedicto.

Culture

During Cainta's modernization period, traditions became more glamorous, most especially during the Lenten season. The most noteworthy rituals are the  Cenakulo (a stage play of the passion and death of Christ) and the Ang Pagpapapako or Penetencia (a re-enactment of the crucifixion of Christ).

The Cenakulo

The Senakulo in Cainta dates back to 1904. It originated from Barrio Dayap (the entire area now includes Barangays Santa Rosa, Sto Niño and Santo Domingo). At that time the population consisted of a small group of residents who were mostly related to each other. Since most of the people believed that calamities were brought in by evil spirits, they decided to put up cross on a vacant lot to counter them. The barrio people paid homage to the cross by lighting it every night. One memorable incident happened during the Lenten season when a strange fragrance supposedly emanated from the cross. The news spread out not only in the barrio but also in the entire town of Cainta.

Believing in the mystery of the cross, many people in Barrio Dayap and the whole town of Cainta have since then vowed to read the Pasyon (Seven Last Words of Christ) every Lenten season. This has been enriched by an actual portrayal of the Passion of Christ on the streets which was formerly called "Officio". Many problems have been allegedly solved and illnesses cured through the cross as many people continuously believed.

Over the years the followers of the cross have multiplied rapidly. To give deeper meaning to their devotion and showcase their religiosity, they broached the idea of staging the Pasyon. The first stage play was held a few years later, although initially it was limited in scope. It became so popular that the presentation was expanded to include stories from the Old Testament and other stages in the life of Christ and has become known as the Cenakulo. The venue was transferred to an open field in 1966 to accommodate a larger audience.

Krus Sa Nayon, Inc. (KSNI) was established as early as 1900 during and after Spanish era. The group was also known for its extravagant preparation and passion play every night of the Holy Week period. The KSNI cenakulo play was previously held at the Jaika Compound beside the municipal building and Francisco P. Felix Memorial National High School. To date, the play is held at the stage beside the municipal ground, alongside the One Cainta Police Headquarters and One Cainta Fire Department.

Samahang Nazareno Inc. was organized in 1960, developed and enhanced the various aspects of cenakulo. The local Roman Catholic parishioner gave the association its moral and financial support for it believed that it was an effective means of imparting its Christian message to the public.

Cainta Day

Every December 1, the town celebrates its foundation and feast of Our Lady of Light (Ina ng Kaliwanagan). It is celebrated with its own festival, SumBingTik (portmanteau of suman, bibingka, and latik), which started around 2014. The week long celebration consists of various activities such as paint ball tournament, battle of the bands, Miss Cainta beauty pageant, and Caindakan sa Kalsada, a street dance parade joined by local schools and organizations.

Infrastructure

Transportation

The main road of Cainta is Ortigas Avenue Extension, a heavily congested corridor that passes through the business district of Ortigas Center and leads to Mandaluyong and San Juan in the west and the town of Taytay and Antipolo in the east. The other major road is Felix Avenue which runs across Ortigas Avenue Extension and connects the town to Marikina to the north. Passing through Cainta Junction, it becomes A. Bonifacio Avenue, a part of Manila East Road, and connects the town further into Taytay.

Public transportation is abundant, as jeepneys and UV Express from surrounding cities in the west like Pasig, Mandaluyong and Quezon City, pass through the town going to other Rizal towns such as Antipolo, Taytay, to as far as Tanay.

Buses are also traversing almost the same routes as jeepneys, with a premium point-to-point bus service introduced in 2019, linking Cainta to Makati CBD.

The extended Manila Line 2 includes a train station at the northern tip of the town called Emerald station is set to open in the last quarter of 2020. This is located beside Santa Lucia East Grand Mall and connects to the second floor of Robinsons Metro East in Barangay San Isidro. Emerald station formerly opened on July 5, 2021.

The newly approved Manila Line 4 is also set to start construction in 2021. This includes 2 train stations to be built at Cainta Junction and St. Joseph Village.

Utilities

Water The town is supplied 24 hours a day with potable water from Manila Water, the MWSS concessionaire for the East Zone, along with several towns in Rizal Province.

Telecommunications Globe and PLDT, primarily provide landline and mobile voice, SMS and data services throughout the town. Others provide alternative data solutions like Converge and Sky Broadband.

Education

Basic education

Private schools:

 Life Touchers Community School
 Cainta Wesleyan Academy
 Light Bearer Christian Academy
 Divine Angels Montessori Of Cainta
 Academy of Christian Excellence Montessori
 Dayspring Academy Greenland Academy Cainta
 College of San Benildo-Rizal
 Faith Christian School 
 Greenland Academy 
 Greenland Academy Cainta 
 Greenpark High School
 Lorenzo Ruiz de Manila School
 Roosevelt College, Inc. (RCI), Cainta
 Roots of Learning Center (now called Colegio Sto. Domingo)
 Saint Francis of Assisi Montessori School of Cainta
 Scholastica De San Alfonso Inc.
 Valley View Academy
 Agapeland Christian Academy
 St. Therese of Lisieux School of Cainta
 Berea Arts and Sciences High School
 APEC Schools Ortigas Extension

Public schools:

 Cainta Elementary School
 Arinda Elementary School
 Exodus Elementary School
 Felix Main Elementary School
 Felix Unit 1 Elementary School
 Kabisig Elementary School
 Planters Elementary School
 San Francisco Elementary School
 Francisco P. Felix Memorial National High School - Main, JICA, Karangalan
 Governor Isidro Rodriguez Memorial National High School
 San Juan National High School 
 Karangalan Elementary School
 Balanti Elementary School
 St. Gregory Elementary School 
 Marick Elementary School

Tertiary

 ABE - Felix Avenue
 Cainta Catholic College
 College of Saint John Paul II Arts and Sciences (Formerly SJB IAS Cainta)
 Informatics - Cainta Brickroad Campus
 Roosevelt College, Inc. (RCI), Cainta
 St. John Bosco Institute of Arts and Sciences
 STI - Academic Center - Ortigas Avenue Extension
 University of Rizal System - Cainta Campus (Public)
 One Cainta College

Notable people
 Rocco Nacino - Actor
 Bearwin Meily - Actor
 Ai-Ai delas Alas - Actress/Comedienne
 Tin Patrimonio - Athlete (tennis), Model, Actress and a former reality show contestant
 Camille Prats - Actress, Model
 Aster Amoyo - television host, talent manager, columnist 
 Lourence Ilagan - PDC Darts player
 Mon Ilagan - Broadcaster, former mayor of Cainta who served in 2004 - 2013

References

Bibliography

External links

 
 Cainta Profile at PhilAtlas.com
 [ Philippine Standard Geographic Code]
 Philippine Census Information
 Local Governance Performance Management System

 
Hinduism in the Philippines
Municipalities of Rizal
Populated places established in 1571
1571 establishments in the Philippines